Marvin Joseph Schatzman (February 18, 1927 – September 19, 2006) was an American professional basketball player. Schatzman was selected in the 1949 BAA draft by the St. Louis Bombers after a collegiate career at Saint Louis. He also played one season in the Eastern Professional Basketball League for the Lancaster Rockets.

NBA career statistics

Regular season

References

External links

1927 births
2006 deaths
Baltimore Bullets (1944–1954) players
Basketball players from Missouri
Forwards (basketball)
Saint Louis Billikens men's basketball players
St. Louis Bombers (NBA) draft picks
American men's basketball players